Shaukat Hussain Shoro(); (b. 4 July 1947 - d. November 9, 2021) in Sindh, a southern province of Pakistan) was a famous short story writer, playwright and columnist of the Sindhi language.

Early life
Shaukat Shoro was born to Abdul Kareem Shoro at a village near Sujawal city of Sujawal District, Sindh. He got his early education from Chandia High school Sujawal in 1963. He did intermediate from Sachal Arts and Commerce college Hyderabad Sindh and did M.A from University of Sindh Jamshoro in 1968. Shoro started writing from childhood. His writings published in various news papers and magazines. He wrote radio and television dramas as well. He remained script producer in Pakistan Television Corporation Karachi Center from 1974 to 1976. Later he was appointed as student welfare of stakes officer in 1977. He rendered his services as  administrative officer on different posts in University of Sindh.

Career
He has created more than 60 short stories, numerous dramas, columns and articles in the Sindhi language and enriched Sindhi literature. His literary and creative work has appeared in the form of books in Pakistan and India. His short story "Death of fear" is included in a book of short stories published in India in 2009. He has also published volumes of short stories "Khoi Hui Perchhai" in 2017 and "Colour of night". His third book is  compilation entitled "Hundred Sindhi short stories".

He remained director of the Institute of Sindhology, University of Sindh, Pakistan.

Death
Shaukat Shoro passed away on November 9, 2021 in Karachi.

References

Pakistani writers
Sindhi people